Zhao Yibo (born 14 November 1988) is a Chinese footballer currently playing as a defender for Chinese club Dalian Jinshiwan.

Career statistics

Club
.

Notes

References

1988 births
Living people
Sportspeople from Anshan
Footballers from Liaoning
Chinese footballers
Association football defenders
China League One players
Shenyang Zhongze F.C. players
Dalian Transcendence F.C. players
Guangdong South China Tiger F.C. players
Jiangxi Beidamen F.C. players